Qiñwa Qullu (Aymara qiñwa a kind of tree, qullu mountain, "qiñwa mountain", also spelled Kheñwa Kkollu) is a mountain in the Andes of Bolivia which reaches a height of approximately . It is located in the Potosí Department, Cornelio Saavedra Province, Tacobamba Municipality. Qiñwa Qullu lies on the left bank of the Ch'aki Mayu (Quechua for "dry river"). Its waters flow to the Pillku Mayu (Quechua for "red river"):

References 

Mountains of Potosí Department